In Ottoman musical theory, aksak is a rhythmic system in which pieces or sequences, executed in a fast tempo, are based on the uninterrupted reiteration of a matrix, which results from the juxtaposition of rhythmic cells based on the alternation of binary and ternary quantities, as in , , , etc. The name literally means "limping", "stumbling", or "slumping", and has been borrowed by Western ethnomusicologists to refer generally to irregular, or additive meters.

In Turkish folk music, these metres occur mainly in vocal and instrumental dance music, though they are found also in some folksongs. Some examples are shown below.

In jazz
The aksak rhythm  is prominently featured in the jazz standard "Blue Rondo à la Turk" by Dave Brubeck.

In rock
The Belgian experimental rock group Aksak Maboul take their name from this rhythm.

See also
Additive rhythm and divisive rhythm

References

Works cited

Further reading
 
 
 

Rhythm and meter
Turkish music